Susan Corkum-Greek  is a Canadian politician, who was elected to the Nova Scotia House of Assembly in the 2021 Nova Scotia general election. She represents the riding of Lunenburg as a member of the Progressive Conservative Association of Nova Scotia.

On August 31, 2021, Corkum-Greek was made Minister of Economic Development.

Prior to her election to the legislature, Corkum-Greek was a journalist and the general manager of the  Lunenburg Academy of Music Performance.

References

Year of birth missing (living people)
Living people
Progressive Conservative Association of Nova Scotia MLAs
Members of the Executive Council of Nova Scotia
Women MLAs in Nova Scotia
21st-century Canadian politicians
21st-century Canadian women politicians